The 2020–21 season is Valencia Basket's 35th in existence and the club's 25th consecutive season in the top flight of Spanish basketball and the sixth season in the EuroLeague. It is the third consecutive season under head coach Jaume Ponsarnau.

Times up to 24 October 2020 and from 28 March 2021 are CEST (UTC+2). Times from 25 October 2020 to 27 March 2021 are CET (UTC+1).

Overview

Pre-season
Although many of its players have been training in the city for days or even weeks, either individually or in small groups, August 19 marked the first time that Valencia Basket brought all of them together for the first collective practice of the 2020–21 season. That group of 14 players under the direction of head coach Jaume Ponsarnau included five newcomers: Martin Hermannsson, Klemen Prepelič, Nikola Kalinić, Derrick Williams and Jaime Pradilla.

Valencia planned to continue working daily, with the exception of the Sunday, on its way to a first preseason game against Joventut on Friday, August 28. The fans in Spain's third-largest city were delighted, too, that the team's very first Turkish Airlines EuroLeague game was at home against LDLC ASVEL on October 1, the opening night of the season!

Players

Squad information

Depth chart

Transactions

In

|}

Out

|}

Pre-season and friendlies

Friendly matches

Turkish Airlines EuroLeague We're back Preseason Tour

Competitions

Overview

Liga ACB

League table

Results summary

Results by round

Matches

ACB Playoffs

Quarterfinals

Semifinals

EuroLeague

League table

Results summary

Results by round

Matches

Copa del Rey

Quarterfinals

References

External links
 Official website

 
Valencia Basket
Valencia Basket